Manuscript with the musical notes, 10th-11th cc. (National Archives of Georgia, fond #1446, manuscript #172) 2 pp. parchment; fragment; dimensions: 143x105; Nuskhuri; ink – brown; title and initials – with cinnabar.

2 small parchment pages written with beautiful calligraphy, brown ink and cinnabar, have preserved a unique system of the Georgian musical notes. A similar note system is preserved only in few old Georgian manuscripts (hymns by Mikael Modrekili, Neumatic hirmologion,  etc.). These musical notes could be read based on an oral tradition survived in separate families up to the 19 c. Regretfully, this tradition has been lost and notwithstanding numerous efforts, this notation system cannot be deciphered.

Literature 
The UNESCO Memory of the World Register. The Manuscripts Preserved in the National Archives of Georgia. Editor/compiler Ketevan Asatiani. Tbilisi. 2016

Internet resources 

http://www.unesco.org/new/en/communication-and-information/memory-of-the-world/register/full-list-of-registered-heritage/registered-heritage-page-8/the-oldest-manuscripts-preserved-at-the-national-archives-of-georgia/

Hymnals
Georgian manuscripts